Panuwat Janta, 1979 in Chantaburi, Thailand) is a Thai futsal Defender, and currently the captain of  Thailand national futsal team.

He competed for Thailand at the 2000, 2004 and 2008 FIFA Futsal World Cup finals.

References

Panuwat Janta
1979 births
Living people
Panuwat Janta
Southeast Asian Games medalists in futsal
Competitors at the 2011 Southeast Asian Games